Paraskos is a surname. Notable people with the surname include: 

Margaret Paraskos (born 1959), Cypriot artist, daughter of Stass
Michael Paraskos (born 1969), British novelist and art critic
Stass Paraskos (1933–2014), Cypriot artist